Gomati, which means, among other things, "full of water", may refer to:

Geography
 Gomati district, a district of Tripura state, India
 Gomati monastery, a monastery in Khotan, Turkistan, see Buddhism in Khotan
 Gomati Lake, a lake in Vadtal, dug by Swaminarayan

Rivers
 Gomati River (Rajasthan), a small river
 Gomati River (Gujarat), source of Dvaravati sila, flows to the Gulf of Kutch
 Gomati River (Uttarakhand), a river in Uttarakhand
 Gomti River, a tributary of the Ganges River in India
 Gomal River, a river in Afghanistan and Pakistan
 Godavari River, a river of Maharashtra and Andhra Pradesh
 Mandovi River, a river of Karnataka and Goa

Ships
 BNS Gomati, ship of the Bangladesh Navy
 INS Gomati, either of two ships of the Indian Navy